The Python was a D.P.V. Rides designed Zyklon-style steel roller coaster. It operated from 1996 to 1999 at Splash Zone Water Park, but was relocated to Coney Island at the end of the 1999 season.

2008 incident 
On May 26, 2008 the Python slightly derailed at the top of its first drop, leaving its lone passenger stranded just over the edge of the drop. There were no injuries. It was closed after the incident. The ride reopened on May 28, 2008.

References

Roller coasters introduced in 1999
Roller coasters in Ohio